is a passenger railway station in the town of Hokota, Ibaraki Prefecture, Japan operated by the third sector Kashima Rinkai Railway.

Lines
Taiyō Station is served by the Kashima Rinkai Railway’s Ōarai Kashima Line, and is located 39.0 km from the official starting point of the line at Mito Station.

Station layout
The station consists of a single island platform, connected to the road and parking lot by footbridges. There is no station building, and the station is unattended.

Platforms

History
Taiyō Station was opened on 14 March 1985 with the opening of the Ōarai Kashima Line.

Passenger statistics
In fiscal 2015, the station was used by an average of 239 passengers daily.

Surrounding area
 
 
former Taiyō Village Hall
Kumiage Post Office

See also
 List of railway stations in Japan

References

External links

 Kashima Rinkai Testudo Station Information 

Railway stations in Ibaraki Prefecture
Railway stations in Japan opened in 1985
Hokota, Ibaraki